Kaullen Mercantile Company, also known as Ben Derkum Store Property and Paul Griffin Marine Sales, is a historic commercial building located at Jefferson City, Cole County, Missouri. It was built in 1896, and a major expansion and rehabilitation of the building occurred in 1923.  It is a 2 1/2-story, "L"-shaped, brick two-part commercial block. It has a hipped roof and two hip roof dormers.  The building housed a grocery store business from 1896 to 1942, and was in the marine retail service from 1942 to 1977.

It was listed on the National Register of Historic Places in 2002.

References

Commercial buildings on the National Register of Historic Places in Missouri
Commercial buildings completed in 1896
Buildings and structures in Jefferson City, Missouri
National Register of Historic Places in Cole County, Missouri